"I Miss You" is a R&B/hip hop song written by Webbie, Mouse and Mannie Fresh for Webbie's second studio album, Savage Life 2 (2008). The song samples Diana Ross' "Missing You", and features LeToya Luckett. It was originally going to feature singer Kelis, but she was replaced for unknown reasons. While the song is about Webbie being on the road and looking forward to returning home to his woman, it is dedicated to Houston rappers that recently have died, mainly for UGK member Pimp C. The song was leaked to the internet on February 5, 2008 and was officially released (for commercial purposes) on March 10, 2008.

Music video
The video was shot in Brooklyn, New York, and was directed by Edwin Decena, who also directed videos for artists such as Plies' "Shawty", Jaheim's "Never", Rich Boy's "Let's Get This Paper" and others.  Although Luckett is not physically present in the video (due to her being part of JD Lawernce's play Rumors), cameo appearances are made by Rick Ross and Lil Phat among others.

Track listing
CD single
 "I Miss You (Radio Version)"
 "I Miss You (Remix Version)"

Credits and personnel
 Vocals: LeToya Luckett

Chart performance
The song entered the Billboard Hot R&B/Hip-Hop Songs chart at number 65, peaking at number 27 on April 25, 2008.

References

2008 singles
Webbie songs
LeToya Luckett songs
Songs written by Lionel Richie
Songs written by Lyrica Anderson
2008 songs
Asylum Records singles
Songs written by Webbie